Xingye (22 September – 14 October 1645) was the era name of Zhu Hengjia, Prince of Jingjiang of the Southern Ming, and was used for a total of 23 days.

Comparison table

Other regime era names that existed during the same period
 China
 Shunzhi (順治, 1644–1661): Qing dynasty — era name of the Shunzhi Emperor
 Yongchang (永昌, 1644–1645): Shun dynasty — era name of Li Zicheng
 Dashun (大順, 1644–1646): Xi dynasty — era name of Zhang Xianzhong
 Vietnam
 Phúc Thái (福泰, 1643–1649): Later Lê dynasty — era name of Lê Chân Tông
 Thuận Đức (順德, 1638–1677): Mạc dynasty — era name of Mạc Kính Vũ
 Japan
 Shōhō (正保, 1644–1648): era name of Emperor Go-Kōmyō

See also
 List of Chinese era names
 List of Ming dynasty era names

Notes

References

Southern Ming eras